The Perpetual Emigrating Fund Company, commonly referred to as the Perpetual Emigration Fund (PEF), was a corporation established by the Church of Jesus Christ of Latter-day Saints (LDS Church) in 1849. The purpose of the corporation was to provide economic assistance to more than 30,000 individuals who sought to emigrate to the Salt Lake Valley and surrounding regions.

The PEF used both church assets and private contributions to aid impoverished converts to the LDS faith when they moved west. As funds were limited, converts seeking aid were ranked by their useful skills and by the duration of their membership in the church. Limits on funds led to innovative preparations and travel methods, including the establishment of handcart companies, to reduce expenses. Once established in their new homes, the converts were expected to repay the funds to the company in cash, commodities, or labor, with minor interest, so others could receive help.

In 1887, during a period of disenfranchisement for the LDS Church, the U.S. Congress enacted the Edmunds–Tucker Act, which disincorporated the LDS Church and the PEF company.

Perpetual Education Fund 

In 2001, the LDS Church established a modern variant of the PEF, dubbing it the Perpetual Education Fund. This new fund helps church members in mostly third-world countries gain an education. Again, once established in a new profession, church members are expected to repay the funds, with minor interest, so others can receive help. Unlike the original PEF, the Perpetual Education Fund is not an incorporated company that is separate from the LDS Church.

References

External links
Perpetual Emigrating Fund Company records, MSS 843, L. Tom Perry Special Collections, Harold B. Lee Library, Brigham Young University. Records are digitized; click on individual items under "Box/folder" to see them.

Mormon migration to Utah
History of the Church of Jesus Christ of Latter-day Saints
The Church of Jesus Christ of Latter-day Saints in Europe
The Church of Jesus Christ of Latter-day Saints in the United States
The Church of Jesus Christ of Latter-day Saints in the United Kingdom
Religious organizations established in 1849
1887 disestablishments in the United States
Defunct organizational subdivisions of the Church of Jesus Christ of Latter-day Saints
1849 establishments in the State of Deseret
20th-century Mormonism